Eupithecia morosa is a moth in the family Geometridae. It is found in Kyrghyzstan.

References

Moths described in 1976
morosa
Moths of Asia